Kiran Bhargava is an Indian television actress. She is the mother of actress Ankita Bhargava Patel and mother in law of Karan Patel. 

She played Daljeet Kohli (Ranbir’s grandmother) in Kumkum Bhagya, and Premlata Shastri in Prem Bandhan (TV series).

She is a professional Kathak dancer trained under Padma Vibhushan Pandit Birju Maharaj since 1976.

Television

References

External links
  Kiran Bhargava on IMDb

Indian television actresses
Living people
Actresses in Hindi television
Year of birth missing (living people)
Place of birth missing (living people)